William Jennings Sheffield Jr. (June 26, 1928 – November 4, 2022) was an American Democratic politician who was the fifth governor of Alaska from 1982 to 1986. Sheffield's term in the governor's mansion was marked by controversy including attempts to have him impeached.

Background
Sheffield was born in Spokane, Washington. He served in the United States Army from 1946 to 1949 and went to DeVry University, then DeForest Training School. Sheffield moved to Alaska in 1953 to sell and service home appliances for Sears. He became active in the local chamber of commerce group, where his participation enabled him to overcome a severe stutter. Sheffield later founded a hospitality business, Sheffield Enterprises, that grew to own and operate 19 Sheffield House hotels across Alaska and in Whitehorse, Yukon. He sold the business to Holland America Line in 1987.

In addition to his business career, Sheffield was involved in politics and government as a Democrat, and was a delegate to numerous local, state, and national party conventions. He served on the Anchorage Planning Commission from 1960 to 1963, and the Anchorage Charter Commission in 1976. In addition, Sheffield served as chair of the state parole board and the University of Alaska Foundation Board.

He died at his Anchorage home on November 4, 2022. He was 94.

Political career
While governor, Sheffield pushed an unpopular bill through the Alaska state legislature to consolidate the state's time zones. Prior to the passage of this bill, Alaska was spread over four time zones (Pacific, Yukon, Alaska-Hawaii, and Bering).  Sheffield's bill placed virtually the entire state (with the sole exception of the Aleutians, starting just west of Dutch Harbor) into the Yukon Time Zone (which was then renamed the Alaska Time Zone).  Initially, this was poorly received; those in the panhandle lost their sense of unity with the west coast of the United States, and those in the heartland of the state were placed, in effect, in a perpetual daylight saving time.  More than twenty years later, the state legislature was still debating the issue, with some members wanting to return the panhandle and capital to Seattle time, and with others claiming that Sheffield broke his promise to revisit the change after a one-year trial period.

As governor, Sheffield was brought before a grand jury investigating a contract that had been awarded by the state amid allegations of favoritism and lack of due process in the awarding process. Sheffield was not indicted. The grand jury report urged the impeachment of Sheffield. The report was leaked to the public after an anonymous source alerted the members of the news media that a waste receptacle in the court building in which grand jury deliberations had been held contained a copy of the report. After the report was made leaked, deliberations about an impeachment began. The Alaskan Constitution requires for an impeachment inquiry to be held before the Alaska Senate can impeach (after which point an impeachment trial would be held by the Alaska House of Representatives). By a 3–2 vote, the committee running the inquiry voted to send the Senate a report concluding that there was insufficient evidence against Sheffield to warrant an impeachment. Instead of impeachment, Senate opted to instead pass a resolution condemning Sheffield's gubernatorial administration for favoritism.

After leaving the position of Governor, Sheffield served as Chairman of the Board of Directors for Alaska Railroad from 1985 to 1997.  In 1997 he was promoted to President and CEO of the railroad, where he served until 2001. As of 2008, he was on the railroad's Board of Directors as Vice Chairman.

References

Authored book

External links
 
 

|-

|-

1928 births
2022 deaths
20th-century American politicians
20th-century American railroad executives
21st-century American memoirists
21st-century American railroad executives
American Presbyterians
Democratic Party governors of Alaska
DeVry University alumni
Politicians from Anchorage, Alaska
Politicians from Spokane, Washington
Military personnel from Spokane, Washington
Writers from Anchorage, Alaska
Writers from Spokane, Washington